Parachanna africana, the African snakehead or Niger snakehead, is a species of fish from west-central Africa. Little is published on its biology. Limited primarily to coastal sections of rivers, it is thought to be a nest-building, thrust predator like other Channidae.

Its native range is southern Benin to southern Nigeria, primarily the Oueme River and the basin of the Niger River.

This specie also referred to as "African snake Head" or "Niger snake head" is uncommon in the aquarium trade. In Nigeria, it is culture for human consumption and used in medicine. This specie is sometimes mistaken for Congener P. obscura, but following Bonou and Teugal (1985), P. Africana can be distinguished from Congener P. obscura by the following combination of characteristics since sometimes they are misapplied:

 Colour pattern is unique – Parachanna africana has a series of 8–11 dark chevron-shaped markings extending along the body posterior to the operculum
 19–24 scales in the transverse series
 Lateral line complete with 73–83 pores scales
 32–35 anal-fin rays.

Most times, the chevron marking may not be visible in a live specimen; this depends on the mood of the fish.

Description
Diagnosis: The body of the specie is elongated, tapering backwards; lateral line scale medium-sized, head depressed anteriorly and covered with larger scales. Lower jaw slightly longer than upper, with 3–4 well developed canines; dorsal fin with 45–48, 8–11 Chevron-shaped dark bars onside.

Coloration: The body color is light to dark grey, back and top of the head darker, underside lighter, dark lateral band on head, broadening between hind margin of the eye and hind margin of Gill cover, followed by a large, rounded black spot; small rounded black spot at the caudal fin.

Habitat
P.africana are freshwater species; Benthopelagic species. They primarily inhabit lowlands, coastal river basins, swamps, lakes, and man-made reservoirs.

Maintenance
This fish specie prefers a dimly-lit aquarium with a layer of surface vegetation such as Ceratopteris spp plus some submerged cover.

It is essential to use a tightly – fitting hood since Parachanna spp are notorious for their ability to escape and a gap should be left between this and the water surface as they require access to a layer of humid air.

■The water condition should have a temperature of about 20–25-degree Celsius, A pH of 5•0–7•5 and the hardness of the water should be 36 – 268ppm

Diet
P.africana is an ambush predator that feeds on smaller fishes and invertebrates in nature but in most cases adapts well to dead alternatives in Captivity. Some specimen accepts dried food though these should never form the stable diet.

Young fish can be fed with chironomid larvae (blood worm), small earthworms, chopped prawns and suchlike while adults will accept strips of fish flesh, whole prawns, mussels, live river shrimps, larger earthworms etc.

Older individuals do not require feeding on daily basis, with 2–3 times per week sufficient.

Note that, this specie should not be fed mammalian or avian mean for example beef heart or chicken since some of the lipids contained in these cannot be properly metabolised by the fish and may cause excess fat deposits and even organ degeneration.

Sexual dimorphism
Adult males are slightly slimmer and smaller than females, they possess a longer, narrower head shape, and slightly extended unpaired fins.

Reproduction
P.africana lay their eggs among floating vegetation or floating plants where they float at the surface and are guarded by the male. Nuptial individuals darken considerably and turn to appear blackish with the peak of reproductI've activity during the wet season.

References
●https://www.fishbase.se/summary/Parachanna-africana

●https://www.seriouslyfish.com/species/parachanna-africana/#:~:text=Maximum%20Standard%20Length,250%20%E2%80%93%20300%20mm.

Further reading

External links
 snakeheads.org

africana
Taxa named by Franz Steindachner
Fish described in 1879